Yugh may refer to:
the Yugh people
the Yugh language